B. Sivasankaran Nair, popularly known as Bichu Thirumala (13 February 1942 – 26 November 2021), was an Indian lyricist and poet. He is known for creating the style of arranging beautiful words in Malayalam film songs. In Malayalam cinema, Bichu Thirumala led the group of lyricists who wrote songs for readymade tunes. He won the Kerala State Film Award for the best lyricist two times. His prolific Malayalam film repertoire includes work with eminent composers like Shyam, G. Devarajan, V. Dakshinamurthy, M.S. Baburaj, K. Raghavan, M.S. Viswanathan, A.T. Ummer, K.J. Joy, Shankar–Ganesh, Jaya Vijaya, Raveendran, Jerry Amaldev, Johnson, Ouseppachan, Ilaiyaraaja, A. R. Rahman and the list goes on.

Life and career
Bichu Thirumala was born to C.G. Bhaskaran Nair and Sasthamangalam Pattanikkunnu Veettil Parukutty Amma in Thiruvananthapuram. He was the eldest child of his parents. His siblings are the late Balagopalan (who died at a young age, on whose remembrance he wrote the all time people's favourite "Olathumbathirunnu" song from the movie Pappayude Swantham Appoos), Susheela Devi, Vijayakumar, Dr. Chandra, Shyama, Darshan Raman and Jayalekshmi. He graduated with a BA from University College Thiruvananthapuram. He was married to Prasanna and they have a son named Suman Bichu (music director).

Bichu Thirumala debuted with the Malayalam Movie Bhaja Govindam  in 1972, which was directed by CRK Nair and with Jaya Vijaya as the music composer .After his modest beginning, Thirumala went on to become one of the most successful Malayalam lyricists and wrote songs for such notable music directors as Shyam, A. T. Ummer, Raveendran, G. Devarajan, and Ilaiyaraaja. In the 1970s he teamed up with music director A. T. Ummer to compose many sweet melodies. Bichu Thirumala penned the lines for AR Rahman's one and only Malayalam music for film, Yodha and the most popular TV Commercial Jingle "Manam Pole Mangalyam" for REMANIKA. His first song "Brahma Muhoorthathil" became popular as a "Lalitha ganam" or light song since the movie Bhaja Govindam did not see the light of the day. Radio Ceylon used to air the song in the early-1970s.

Death
Bichu Thirumala, whose career stalled after a massive accident at his home in 1994, was admitted to S. K. hospital in Thiruvananthapuram with breathing problems and had suffered a heart attack as well. He had been on ventilator support after his condition worsened, and died on 26 November 2021 at the age of 79. His dead body was cremated with full state honours at Santhikavadam crematorium on the same day. He was survived by his wife Prasanna (retired finance officer, KWA) and son Suman Bichu (music director).

Awards

Other Awards
 Critics Award 
 Film Fans Award 
 Stallion International Award
 Vamadevan Award
 Sree Chithirathirunal Award
 P.Bhaskaran Award

References

External links
 
 

1941 births
2021 deaths
Malayalam-language lyricists
People from Kerala
Kerala State Film Award winners
People from Thiruvananthapuram district